This page is the discography of the Greek singer Konstantinos Argyros.

It consists of six studio albums and twenty-two singles, including "Ximeromata" which is one of the most viewed Greek songs on YouTube.

Discography

Studio albums

Extended plays & CD Singles

Singles

References

Discographies of Greek artists